David Kritchevsky (January 25, 1920 – November 20, 2006, Bryn Mawr, Pennsylvania) was an American biochemist and expert in lipid nutrition and cholesterol in particular.

Kritchevsky was born in Kharkiv (then part of Ukrainian People's Republic) to a Jewish family. He was brought to the United States in 1923 and graduated from the University of Chicago in 1939. He has been cited as "one of the most influential researchers on diet and health of the 20th century".

Awards and recognition
An incomplete list of Kritchevsky's awards include:

1968: St. Ambrose Medal from the City of Milan, Italy
1974: Borden Award from the American Institute of Nutrition
1977: Philadelphia Award from the American Chemical Society
1978: Outstanding Achievement Award from the American College of Nutrition
1979: Professional Achievement Award from the University of Chicago
1992: Robert H. Herman Memorial Award from the American Society for Clinical Nutrition
1994: Auenbrugger Medal from the University of Graz, Austria
1996: Supelco-AOCS Research Award from the American Oil Chemists Society
1999: Special Recognition Award from the International Soybean Symposium
2001: an honorary D.Sc. from Purdue University
2005: Lifetime Achievement Award from the International Whole Grains Symposium
2006: Alton E. Bailey Award from the American Oil Chemists Society

In 2006 the American Society for Nutrition established the David Kritchevsky Career Achievement Award and Kritchevsky was its inaugural recipient.

The American Heart Association established the David Kritchevsky memorial lecture, presented at its annual meeting.

References

1920 births
2006 deaths
American biochemists
American nutritionists
Soviet emigrants to the United States
University of Chicago alumni
Northwestern University alumni